Gabriela Dabrowski and Marie-Ève Pelletier were the defending champions. Pelletier chose not to participate, so Dabrowski partnered with Alla Kudryavtseva and won the title 6–2, 7–6(7–2) over Eugenie Bouchard and Jessica Pegula.

Seeds

Draw

References 
 Main draw

Tevlin Women's Challenger
Tevlin Women's Challenger